Bryan Antoine (born April 26, 2000) is an American college basketball player for the Radford Highlanders of the Big South Conference. He previously played for the Villanova Wildcats.

High school career
A resident with his family of Tinton Falls, New Jersey, Antoine attended Ranney School in Tinton Falls for his four years in high school where he played along with Scottie Lewis. He averaged 21 points per game as a senior and led the school to 31 wins and the NJSIAA Tournament of Champions. He finished his career with 2,514 points. Antoine was named a McDonald's All-American.

Recruiting
Antoine was a consensus five-star recruit and one of the top players in the 2019 class. On September 4, 2018, he committed to playing college basketball for Villanova over offers from Duke, Florida, Kansas, and Kentucky.

College career
Antoine underwent glenoid labrum surgery in May 2019 and was not cleared to practice until November. He made his college debut against Middle Tennessee on November 21, finishing with nine points and two assists. Antoine struggled to find consistent playing time due to the aftereffects of the injury and considered sitting out the season as a redshirt, but eventually decided to play limited minutes as he was "a patient person." He averaged 1.1 points and 0.4 rebounds per game as a freshman. As a sophomore, Antoine struggled with injuries and averaged 2.3 points and 1.2 rebounds per game.

Career statistics

College

|-
| style="text-align:left;"| 2019–20
| style="text-align:left;"| Villanova
| 16 || 0 || 5.4 || .304 || .133 || 1.000 || .4 || .3 || .2 || .0 || 1.1
|-
| style="text-align:left;"| 2020–21
| style="text-align:left;"| Villanova
| 10 || 0 || 11.8 || .412 || .385 || .800 || 1.2 || .7 || .5 || .0 || 2.3
|-
| style="text-align:left;"| 2021–22
| style="text-align:left;"| Villanova
| 20 || 0 || 10.0 || .238 || .172 || 1.000 || 1.2 || .5 || .3 || .1 || 1.5
|- class="sortbottom"
| style="text-align:center;" colspan="2"| Career
| 46 || 0 || 8.8 || .293 || .211 || .909 || .9 || .5 || .3 || .0 || 1.5

References

External links
Radford Highlanders bio
Villanova Wildcats bio
USA Basketball bio

2000 births
Living people
American men's basketball players
Basketball players from New Jersey
McDonald's High School All-Americans
People from Nyack, New York
People from Tinton Falls, New Jersey
Radford Highlanders men's basketball players
Ranney School alumni
Shooting guards
Sportspeople from Monmouth County, New Jersey
Villanova Wildcats men's basketball players